Crucibulum spinosum, common name the spiny cup-and-saucer snail, is a species of sea snail, a marine gastropod mollusk in the family Calyptraeidae, the slipper snails and cup-and-saucer snails.

Description
The shell has a width of 44.6 mm.

Distribution
This species is native to the west coast of the Americas, from California to Chile. It has been introduced and established in Hawaii.

References

Zoologie, vol. 2(1), p. 471 p., 16 pls

External links
 http://www2.bishopmuseum.org/HBS/invertguide/species/crucibulum_spinosum.htm

Calyptraeidae
Gastropods described in 1824
Taxa named by George Brettingham Sowerby I